Solirubrobacter ginsenosidimutans  is a Gram-positive, non-spore-forming, aerobic and non-motile bacterium from the genus of Solirubrobacter which has been isolated from soil from a ginseng field from the Baekdu Mountain in China.

types

References

 

Actinomycetota
Bacteria described in 2011